The Paddys River, a perennial river that is part of the Hawkesbury-Nepean catchment, is located in the Southern Highlands region of New South Wales, Australia.

Course and features
Formed by the confluence of Reedy Creek and Munros Gully, the Paddys River rises west of Bundanoon, and flows generally west northwest, before reaching its confluence with the Wollondilly River west of the locality of Cayonleigh.

The Hume Freeway crosses the river near the locality of Paddys River.

See also 

 List of rivers of New South Wales (L–Z)
 List of rivers of Australia
 Rivers of New South Wales

References

External links
 

Rivers of New South Wales
Southern Highlands (New South Wales)
Hume Highway